Princess Margarita of Leiningen (Margarita Ileana Viktoria Alexandra Prinzessin zu Leiningen; 9 May 1932 – 16 June 1996) was a Princess of Leiningen by birth and the Princess of Hohenzollern by marriage. Margarita was the fourth child and second-eldest daughter of Karl, 6th Prince of Leiningen and his wife Grand Duchess Maria Kirillovna of Russia. Margarita was the Princess consort of Hohenzollern 6 February 1965 – 16 June 1996.

Marriage and issue
Margarita married Frederick William, Hereditary Prince of Hohenzollern (later Frederick William, Prince of Hohenzollern), eldest son of Frederick, Prince of Hohenzollern, and his wife, Princess Margarete Karola of Saxony, civilly in Sigmaringen on 5 January 1951 and religiously in Amorbach on 3 February 1951. Margarita and Frederick William had three sons:

 Karl Friedrich, Prince of Hohenzollern (20 April 1952); married Countess Alexandra Schenck von Stauffenberg on 17 May 1985 and they were divorced on 21 January 2010. They have four children. He remarried  Nina de Zomer on 17 July 2010. 
 Prince Albrecht Johannes Hermann Meinrad Hubertus Michael Stephan of Hohenzollern (3 August 1954); married Nathalie Rocabado de Viets on 8 September 2001. They have two daughters:
 Princess Josephine Marie Isabelle Sophia Margarete of Hohenzollern (31 October 2002)
 Princess Eugenia Bernadette Maria Theresia Esperanza of Hohenzollern (8 June 2005)
 Prince Ferdinand of Hohenzollern (14 February 1959); married Countess Ilona Kálnoky de Köröspatak on 3 August 1996. They have three children.

Ancestry

References

Margarita of Leiningen, Princess
Margarita of Leiningen, Princess
Leiningen family
German princesses
Princesses of Leiningen
Princesses of Hohenzollern-Sigmaringen
People from Coburg
Suicides in Germany